M.D.: Life on the Line (Spanish: Médicos, línea de vida) is a Mexican telenovela that premiered on Las Estrellas on 11 November 2019. The series is produced by José Alberto Castro for Televisa, and stars Livia Brito, Daniel Arenas and Rodolfo Salas. Production began in August 2019.

On 7 February 2020, producer José Alberto Castro confirmed that the series had been renewed for a second season.

Plot 
Set in a hospital staffed by the most brilliant doctors in their field, the series follows the story of Gonzalo Olmedo, an idealist and dedicated internist. Gonzalo is appointed director of the hospital after the assassination of his predecessor. Upon assuming his position, he discovers the complexities of operating a hospital teeming with the deficiencies associated with bureaucracy and corruption at the top echelons of its prior administration. To carry out the transformation, Gonzalo recruits a group of leading professionals who heal the most complex cases and, at the same time, strive to heal the wounds of their personal lives.

Cast

Main 
 Livia Brito as Regina Villaseñor
 Daniel Arenas as David Paredes
 Grettell Valdez as Ana Caballero
 José Elías Moreno Jr. as Gonzalo Olmedo
 Carlos de la Mota as Luis Galván
 Isabel Burr as Cinthia Guerrero
 Marisol del Olmo as Constanza Madariaga
 Erika de la Rosa as Mireya Navarro
 Rodrigo Murray as René Castillo
 Federico Ayos as Rafael Calderón
 Daniel Tovar as Daniel Juárez
 Dalilah Polanco as Luz González
 Scarlet Gruber as Tania Olivares
 Mauricio Henao as Marco Zavala
 Lorena García as Pamela Miranda
 Michel López as Diego Martínez
 Rodolfo Salas as Arturo Molina
 Jorge Ortiz de Pinedo as Dr. Enrique Lara
 Iliana Fox as Susana Álvarez
 Osvaldo de León as Sergio Ávila
 Luis Gatica as Paco Juárez
 Raquel Garza as Elena Estrada
 Eugenia Cauduro as Patricia Antúnez
 Irineo Álvarez as Andrés Guerrero
 Lía Ferré as Cecilia Núñez
 María Alicia Delgado as Martha
 Miguel Pizarro as Esteban Zavala
 Carina Ricco as Pilar de Miranda
 Roberto Miguel as Agustín Miranda
 Eugenio Montessoro as Santiago Montesinos
 Ricardo Mendonza "El Coyote" as Miguel
 Jaime Maqueo as Gabriel Galván Álvarez
 Karen Furlong as Carolina "Caro"

Guest stars 
 Altair Jarabo as Victoria Escalante
 Guillermo García Cantú as Alonso Vega
 José María Torre as Roberto Morelli
 David Zepeda as Ricardo Bustamante
 Julián Gil as Carlos Ibarra

Ratings

Episodes 

Notes

Awards and nominations

References 

2019 telenovelas
Mexican telenovelas
Televisa telenovelas
2019 Mexican television series debuts
Spanish-language telenovelas
Medical telenovelas
2020 Mexican television series endings